Jayson William More (born January 12, 1969) is a Canadian professional ice hockey coach and former player. More was drafted by the New York Rangers in the first round, 10th overall, in the 1987 NHL Entry Draft.

Born in Souris, Manitoba, More played four seasons in the Western Hockey League junior league. More made his professional debut as a 19-year-old with the International Hockey League's Denver Rangers in the 1988–89 season. He also appeared in one NHL game with the New York Rangers that same season.

More was traded to the Minnesota North Stars early in the 1989–90 season in exchange for Dave Archibald. He spent one year with the North Stars organization before being traded to the Montreal Canadiens for goaltender Brian Hayward. More never appeared in a game with the Canadiens, spending the season with the AHL's Fredericton Canadiens, before being exposed in the 1991 NHL Expansion Draft and selected 2nd by the San Jose Sharks.

After five seasons with the Sharks, More was traded back to the New York Rangers before the 1996–97 season in a trade which brought Marty McSorley to San Jose. More only played 14 games in his second stint with the Rangers, however, before being sent to the Phoenix Coyotes. During the 1997–98 season, the Coyotes traded him to the Chicago Blackhawks along with Chad Kilger in exchange for Keith Carney and Jim Cummins.

At 28 More suffered a career-ending injury with the Nashville Predators in the 1998–99 season. In his NHL career, he appeared in 406 games. He scored 18 goals and added 54 assists. He also played in 31 Stanley Cup playoff games, recording six assists. In 2011, More was inducted into the Manitoba Hockey Hall of Fame for his contributions as a player and coach.

Career statistics

Awards
 WHL West First All-Star Team – 1988

External links

1969 births
Brandon Wheat Kings players
Canadian ice hockey defencemen
Chicago Blackhawks players
Denver Rangers players
Fredericton Canadiens players
Ice hockey people from Manitoba
Kalamazoo Wings (1974–2000) players
Kansas City Blades players
Lethbridge Broncos players
Living people
Minnesota North Stars players
Nashville Predators players
National Hockey League first-round draft picks
New Westminster Bruins players
New York Rangers draft picks
New York Rangers players
Phoenix Coyotes players
San Jose Sharks players
People from Souris, Manitoba